Holcha Krake (1885-1944) was a Danish born textile artist and the wife of the Harlem Renaissance artist William H. Johnson.

Biography
Krake was born on April 6, 1885 in Karlby Sogn, Denmark. Krake studied in textile design in Sweden, Norway. and Denmark. In 1929 she met the artist William H. Johnson (1901-1970) when both were in France. They were married in Denmark in 1930 and resided in Norway for a time before settling in New York in 1938. Johnson often used Krake as a subject.

Krake died of breast cancer in New York City on January 13, 1944. Her work is in the collection of the Smithsonian American Art Museum. In 2019 the Florence County Museum in Florence, South Carolina held an exhibition of the couple's work called Willie and Holcha.

Gallery

References

External links

1885 births
1944 deaths
19th-century Danish women artists
20th-century Danish women artists
20th-century Danish artists
Deaths from breast cancer
Women textile artists